Horace Phillips may refer to:

Horace Phillips (baseball) (1853–1896), Pittsburgh Pirates manager
Horace Phillips (diplomat) (1917–2004), British diplomat